SJW or Social justice warrior is a pejorative term for someone who promotes socially progressive views.

SJW or sjw may also refer to:

Organizations
 Sir James Whitney School for the Deaf, Canada
 SJW Group, a water utility company in California, US
 Stanford Jazz Workshop, an organization for jazz education

Other uses
 Shawnee language (ISO 639-3 code: sjw)
 Shijiazhuang Zhengding International Airport (IATA code: SJW)

See also
 St. John's Wort, any species of the genus Hypericum
 Sino-Japanese War (disambiguation)